Jane McGregor (born 1983) is a Canadian actress, known for her roles in Slap Her... She's French (2002), Flower & Garnet (2002), and That Beautiful Somewhere (2006), as well as her recurring role on the television series Robson Arms.

Personal life 
McGregor was born in 1983, and still resides in her native Vancouver. She has a sister. McGregor would like to work with Christopher Guest and considers Lucille Ball her favourite comedian. She enjoys interviews, but hates auditioning.

Career 
McGregor's career began with classes at the Vancouver Youth Theatre at the age of eight, which were followed by toy commercials. Her first television appearance was a guest role on two episodes of the Canadian television series The Odyssey, as 'Linda'. Following this she appeared in a string of made-for-television movies.

In 1999, McGregor appeared in an episode of the Disney series So Weird as Gabe Crawford, the girlfriend of a lead character.

In 2002 she starred as the popular Texas cheerleader Starla Grady in Slap Her... She's French with Piper Perabo, and followed the American comedy with Canadian independent film Flower & Garnet, where she plays an isolated, pregnant teenager.

Also in 2002 she won the Women In Film And Video Vancouver Artistic Merit Award for Flower & Garnet and Bitten.

In 2005 she appeared in an episode of Supernatural as a preacher's daughter, and had a small part playing Keri Russell's sister in the Hallmark Hall of Fame drama The Magic of Ordinary Days.

In 2006 she portrayed Catherine Nyland, an archaeologist suffering from debilitating migraines in That Beautiful Somewhere, opposite Roy Dupuis. From 2005 to 2008 she had a recurring role as Alicia Plecas in the Canadian series Robson Arms, and in 2007 she appeared in American Venus as Jenna Lane, a competitive ice skater hovering on the brink of a mental breakdown due to her controlling mother (portrayed by Rebecca De Mornay).

She has taught acting at Biz Studios, and currently teaches a Teen Intensive at Vada Studios in Vancouver.

Most recently, McGregor has had guest roles on The Listener, Almost Human, and FX’s Fargo.

Filmography

Film

Television

References

External links 

 

1983 births
Living people
Canadian child actresses
Canadian film actresses
Canadian television actresses
Canadian voice actresses
Actresses from Vancouver